Activating transcription factor 7-interacting protein 1 is a protein that in humans is encoded by the ATF7IP gene.

Interactions
ATF7IP has been shown to interact with MBD1.

References

Further reading

External links
 
 PDBe-KB provides an overview of all the structure information available in the PDB for Human Activating transcription factor 7-interacting protein 1 (ATF7IP)